Ferroviário Atlético Clube, commonly referred to as Ferroviário, is a Brazilian professional club based in Fortaleza, Ceará founded on 9 May 1933. It competes in the Campeonato Brasileiro Série C, the third tier of Brazilian football, as well as in the Campeonato Cearense, the top flight of the Ceará state football league.

History
The club was founded after two amateur soccer teams, named Matapasto and Jurubeba fused, and after RVC (Rede de Viação Cearense, "Cearense Transit Net"), a railroad company, wanted to have a team playing in Campeonato Cearense. On May 9, 1933 the team was founded as Ferroviário Foot-Ball Club. The club changed its name to Ferroviário Atlético Clube after some time.

In 1937, Ferroviário won its first title, the Campeonato Cearense Second Division, being promoted to the following year's first division. In 1945, the club won its first state championship, the Campeonato Cearense, after beating Maguari 3-1 in the final. In 1968, Ferroviário won the Campeonato Cearense without losing a single match.

On December 6, 2005, a Ferroviário player, Alessandro, died during a training at Vila Olímpica Elzir Cabral.

Honours
 Campeonato Brasileiro Série D
 Winners (1): 2018

 Campeonato Cearense
 Winners (9): 1945, 1950, 1952, 1968, 1970, 1979, 1988, 1994, 1995

 Copa Fares Lopes
 Winners (2): 2018, 2020

 Copa dos Campeões Cearenses
 Winners (1): 2019

External links
 Official Site
 Ferroviário on Globo Esporte

Ferroviário Atlético Clube (CE)
Association football clubs established in 1933
Football clubs in Ceará
Football clubs in Brazil
Sport in Fortaleza
1933 establishments in Brazil
Campeonato Brasileiro Série D winners